Extreme Croquet is a variation on croquet mainly distinguished by its lack of any requirement pertaining to out-of-bounds or field specifications.   A close relative of the croquet played in most backyards and gardens, but expanded by more adventurous enthusiasts and played throughout the world in conditions unfamiliar to official tournament players.

Game setup
A typical extreme croquet game starts with location scouting, searching for terrain that might present interesting and novel challenges such as trees, roots, hills, sand, mud, or moving or still water.  Play proceeds following the usual croquet rules, with alterations generally designed to handle circumstances not found in the garden game.

Traditional backyard croquet equipment can be used but is prone to damage. Mallets, made specifically for extreme croquet, are made from high-density polyethylene, aluminum, polycarbonate and other durable materials.

Rules
Different organizations use different sets of rules for extreme croquet. Variations include the following:
When one ball strikes another, the striker may choose to continue play as the strikee's ball.
A player receives an extra stroke for passing through a second story of a wicket.
A player may strike the ball with any part of the mallet, including a billiards-reminiscent style.
The first player through the second wicket determines the direction of play.
As each player reaches the starting post after clearing all wickets, they are "poison" and must declare their status to all players.
A non-poison player can eliminate a poison player by sending the latter through a wicket.
Passing through a wicket out of order is punished by sending the ball back to the previous post.
Small children, dogs, and ponies are legal obstacles, and if they interfere with the ball's placement, the player must still "play it where it lies."
The Richmond Extreme Croquet Group has these rules:
Revert Rule: If a ball traverses its prior wicket in the opposite direction, this now becomes its current wicket; exceptions: (1) a rover cannot be reverted; (2) until the ball remakes that wicket, it cannot be reverted again.
Nosering Rule: Once per game, at the end of one's turn, one may move one's ball exactly one mallet head, except not into or thru any wicket in either direction; in a team game, one may use a teammate's unused nosering move.
Alzheimer's Rule: Before or after hitting the ball, if that player or anyone else realizes that the player forgot their current wicket, the hit is retaken (if in fact it has been taken), except when croqueting another ball; all players have the obligation to point this out.
Acts of Dog:  If a player's ball is relocated by an unleashed dog, it shall be played from the location the dog releases the ball.  If the ball is released out of bounds, then the ball shall be played from the point (after adjusting for a mallet width from the boundary) it was removed from the field.
Dynamic Starting Order: After lagging to the stake for starting order, the players exercise the option to go or not go in order of closeness; after each player goes, the remaining players re-choose who goes next in the same order.

Extreme croquet locations

Extreme croquet dates back to the 1920s, when fashionable people built courses with sand traps and other hazards in California and on Long Island. The world's oldest extreme croquet club was founded 1975 in Sweden.  The first documented extreme croquet matches in the United States took place in Friendswood, Texas, around 1995.  A group of college kids looking for a bit more excitement than the traditional game could offer began to test the boundaries of the sport.

Boston University is the home of BU International Extreme Croquet Society. The organization was founded in 2008. On April 5, 2010 BU Today featured a film  on the club.

The Northwest Arkansas Nonprofessional-professional Extreme Croquet Association, or NANECA utilizes both urban and natural settings for its free flowing extreme croquet.

Dubuque, Iowa is well accepted as the national epicenter of extreme croquet. The midwest town boasts two competitive extreme croquet leagues. ADCA (All Dubuque Croquet Association) was founded by Norman Charles Freund in 1982 and DCA (Dubuque Croquet Association) was founded by Norman's youngest heir, Gabriel Martin Freund in 2003. Both leagues have been featured in national publications.

Articles
"A Short History of Croquet" introduction to croquet
"EXTREME CROQUET" The history of Extreme croquet from the  Quicksilver Magazine
"Extreme Satisfaction" feature article in Washington D.C. CityPaper about extreme croquet
"Pardon, But My Last Shot Seems to Have Spilled Your Beer" from the San Francisco Chronicle
"With Mallets Aforethought" from Smithsonian Magazine

References

Croquet